Montgomery Park may refer to:

Montgomery Park (Portland, Oregon), a building in Oregon, United States
Montgomery Park, Ontario, a community within the town of Mississippi Mills, Ontario, Canada
Montgomery Park Race Track, a horse racing track in Memphis, Tennessee